Salbakuta is a Filipino rap group formed by Andrew E. The group achieved mainstream success with their breakout single "S2pid Luv", which heavily interpolates Barbra Streisand's "Evergreen".

Career
Initially working as personal assistants for Andrew E., the group's name originated from when Andrew E. asked the members to come up with a name. Charlie Mac, who is of Bicolano descent, explained in an interview that the term "salbakuta" is Bicolano for "naughty" or "mischievous".

The group rose to prominence in 2001 with their single "S2pid Luv", which Andrew E. penned as they were looking for a radio-friendly single for their debut album Ayoko ng Ganitong Life ("I Hate This Kind of Life"). Despite some controversy over the group's use of explicit lyrics (the album cover already bearing a parental disclaimer similar to the Parental Advisory label used on Western albums) and the Barbra Streisand-derived hook, "S2pid Luv" proved to be a breakthrough single for the group, also spawning a feature-length romantic comedy film adaptation in 2002  starring Andrew E. and Blakdyak. An alternate version of "S2pid Luv" with an original hook in Tagalog instead of the "Evergreen" sample was later released.

Members
Charliemac
MadKilla
Jawtee
BenDeatha
NastyMac

Discography

Albums
 Ayoko ng Ganitong Life (2001)
 S2pid Luv OST (2002)
 Meron ka bang Ganitong Life (2003)
 Pang-romansa Espesyal (2005)
 Rebirth (2014)

Singles
 Stupid Love (2001)
 Di Karapat Dapat (2002)
 Yo Gloria (feat. Rachelle Ann Go) (2004)
 Wag kang Magtaka (feat. Baby Bell) (2012)
 Mabuti na lang (feat. Jay R) (2013)
 Sa Una lang pala (feat. R-Jay) (2017)
 Bounce (2021)
 Nang Ma-in love ako sayo (2021)

References

Filipino hip hop groups
Pop-rap groups
Musical groups established in 2001
2001 establishments in the Philippines
Musical groups from Metro Manila